Ciro Pablo Rius Argallo (born 27 October 1988) is an Argentine footballer who plays for Atlético Tucumán in the Argentine Primera División as a second striker or winger.

Career

Club career

Rius made his breakthrough into the Argentinos Juniors first team in a 0-2 home defeat against Arsenal on 7 February 2009. He was a non-playing member of the Argentinos squad that won the Clausura 2010 championship, but since then he has become a regular first team player. He scored his first goal for the club in a 0-2 win against Boca Juniors.

On 11 June 2019, Rius signed a 3-year contract with Rosario Central, but on 12 August 2020, he came back to Defensa y Justicia for free.

References

External links
 
 
 Argentine Primera statistics at Futbol XXI 
 
 
 

1984 births
Living people
Sportspeople from Buenos Aires Province
Argentine people of Catalan descent
Argentine footballers
Association football midfielders
Argentine Primera División players
Primera Nacional players
Argentinos Juniors footballers
Godoy Cruz Antonio Tomba footballers
Aldosivi footballers
Defensa y Justicia footballers
Club Atlético Lanús footballers
Rosario Central footballers
Atlético Tucumán footballers